In number theory, the radical of a positive integer n is defined as the product of the distinct prime numbers dividing n. Each prime factor of n occurs exactly once as a factor of this product:

The radical plays a central role in the statement of the abc conjecture.

Examples 

Radical numbers for the first few positive integers are
 1, 2, 3, 2, 5, 6, 7, 2, 3, 10, 11, 6, 13, 14, 15, 2, 17, 6, 19, 10, 21, 22, 23, 6, 5, 26, 3, 14, 29, 30, 31, 2, 33, 34, 35, 6, 37, 38, 39, 10, 41, 42, 43, 22, 15, 46, 47, 6, 7, 10, ... .

For example,

and therefore

Properties 

The function  is multiplicative (but not completely multiplicative).

There is no known polynomial-time algorithm for computing the square-free part of an integer.

References

Multiplicative functions

de:Zahlentheoretische Funktion#Multiplikative Funktionen